Stealing Rembrandt (original title Rembrandt) is a 2003 Danish-language film. An action-comedy, the film concerns a father and son who accidentally steal a painting by Rembrandt. A Danish/UK co-production, the film was directed by Jannik Johansen and written by Anders Thomas Jensen and Jannik Johansen.

The film was premiered at the 2003 Cannes Film Festival.

Relation to real events
On 29 January 1999, Rembrandt's "portrait of a lady" (as well as another painting by Bellini) was stolen from the poorly protected Nivaagaard Samlingen in Nivå in Denmark. The depiction in the film of the level of security at that time is fairly accurate, as well as the involvement of bounty hunters as civilian agents in the case. Also, the persons involved were related as depicted, although the role of the father (Mick in the movie) was actually the uncle (of Tom in the movie).

Cast
Lars Brygmann - Mick
Jakob Cedergren - Tom
Nikolaj Coster-Waldau - Kenneth (as Nikolaj Coster Waldau)
Nicolas Bro - Jimmy
Sonja Richter - Trine
Søren Pilmark - Bæk
Gordon Kennedy - Christian
Paprika Steen - Charlotte
Ulf Pilgaard - Flemming
Thomas W. Gabrielsson - Erik
Ole Ernst - Frank
Nikolaj Lie Kaas - Kiosk Karsten
Patrick O'Kane - Nigel
Martin Wenner - Toby
Søren Poppel - Allan Rocker

See also
Cinema of Denmark

Notes

External links
Official site

2003 films
Danish action comedy films
2000s Danish-language films
2003 comedy films
Films with screenplays by Anders Thomas Jensen
Works about Rembrandt